Serge Beynaud (real name Guy Serge Beynaud Gnolou but sometimes also called Beynaud; born 19 September 1987 in Yopougon, Abidjan) is an Ivorian singer, songwriter and music producer, associated with styles such as Coupé-Décalé and Loko loko.

AllAfrica.com has described Beynaud as an "Ivorian sensation" and a "heavyweight act". In February 2015, he was #1 in the StarAfrica Top 10, with his song Fouinta Fouinte.

Biography 
Born in Yopougon in the south-east of Abidjan in the Lagunes Region to a military father, he has been composing songs since his childhood. He is noted for his stylish and dandy style of dress and is one of the most noted figures in the Coupé-Décalé scene. His ethnicity can be traced to the Bété people.

Albums
Le mannequin des arrangeurs
Seul Dieu
Talehi

References

1987 births
Living people
21st-century Ivorian male singers
People from Abidjan